is a private women's university in Osaka, Osaka Prefecture, Japan.

Department 

 Department of International & English Interdisciplinary Studies

Graduate school 

 Graduate School of International Collaboration in the 21st Century
 Master's and Doctoral Courses of Peace Studies and Human Rights Studies

References

External links
 Official site

Private universities and colleges in Japan
Christian universities and colleges in Japan
Christianity in Osaka
Universities and colleges in Osaka
Association of Christian Universities and Colleges in Asia
Women's universities and colleges in Japan
Educational institutions established in 2004
2004 establishments in Japan